Branko Milosevic (born 21 August 1964) is a midfielder who made several appearances for the Socceroos. Milosevic was known for his physical athleticism, distribution and skill with the ball.

Europe
Born in Osijek, SR Croatia, SFR Yugoslavia, Branko Milosevic played for Olimpija Osijek as a junior and later was picked up by NK Dinamo Zagreb where he played with the likes of Zvonimir Boban in the Yugoslav First League. Branko left zagreb shortly after arriving and joined SSV Ulm 1846 in Germany where he had two successful seasons before coming to Australia.

Australia
Milosevic came to Australia in 1987 and played for Croatian side Melbourne Croatia (Melbourne Knights). He was an instant star; he brought so many great qualities to the NSL and was arguably the best player in Australia. He left Melbourne Knights in 1991 to move to Sydney side Sydney Olympic FC where he was one of the crowds favourite. He had a great first season and Australian coach Eddie Thompson marked him as his player of the year unfortunately he finished runner up in the Johnny Warren medal as he did a few years back while at Melbourne Knights. Milosevic left Sydney Olympic FC in 1995 after Coach David Ratcliffe dropped the Socceroo midfielder out of the squad without a reason. West Adelaide were quick to offer and brought Milosevic to Adelaide. After a couple of seasons at West Adelaide Branko was able to change his game style and play as sweeper, despite being in his 30s. He was playing very well and kept the West Adelaide SC defense strong and organised and was then appointed captain in 1997. Milosevic then announced his retirement from the NSL in 1999 after the club announced that they were pulling out of the NSL due to a financial crisis. 10 years later Branko made his comeback to play for Adelaide Olympic in 2009 and won the premier league player of the year at 45 years of age despite only playing 7 games. But that wasn't all he achieved in 2009, Branko and his son Alen became the first father and son to play together in the same team in the premier league. Branko currently coaches Adelaide Olympic

National Honour
Milosevic made his Australian debut against South Korea in 1990. He made 15 appearances and scored 2 goals. Milosevic scored against New Zealand in 1991, and North Korea in 1992.

Coaching career
Milosevic took up his first job as manager to Adelaide Olympic in 2000 where he was player/Coach in the premier league (2nd division), he won the league undefeated and was promoted into the super league (1st division). The following year he finished 6th in the super league and 6th again in 2002. Branko then coached the SA state teams for a couple years before joining Adelaide Raiders in 2005 where in his first year he finished 2nd in the league and 2nd in the league cup losing out to rivals White City in extra time.

After making his comeback to soccer in 2009 for Adelaide Olympic as player/assistant coach the club appointed Branko as the head coach for the 2010 season.

On September 28th 2017 it was announced Milosevic was taking up the senior coaching role at the SAASL Saturday Division 2 Club Adelaide Titans.

External links
 http://www.ozfootball.net/ark/Players/M/MI.htmlhttp://www.ozfootball.net/ark/Socceroo/1993A.htmlhttps://web.archive.org/web/20080910222841/http://www.sesasport.com.au/pages/documents/Croatiasquads1953-2006.pdfhttps://web.archive.org/web/20080324140821/http://www.croatiasa.com/soccerclub/raiders.htmhttp://www.ozfootball.net/ark/Socceroo/1991A.htmlhttp://www.footballnews.com.au/forum/viewtopic.php?f=4&t=22790http://www.footballnews.com.au/forum/viewtopic.php?f=4&t=32994http://standard-messenger.whereilive.com.au/sport/story/super-league-alagich-leads-raiders/https://web.archive.org/web/20060821223639/http://members.ccmariners.com.au/aleague/CCM/article/show.asp?articleid=5974&menuItemID=%3Cbr />http://www.adam.com.au/ahowe/nsl/d13/m9293110.htmlhttp://www.adam.com.au/ahowe/nsl/d13/m9798125.html

1964 births
Living people
Sportspeople from Osijek
Australian soccer players
Australia international soccer players
Australian expatriate soccer players
National Soccer League (Australia) players
Yugoslav footballers
Association football midfielders
Yugoslav First League players
GNK Dinamo Zagreb players
Melbourne Knights FC players
SSV Ulm 1846 players
Sydney Olympic FC players
West Adelaide SC players
Australian soccer coaches